Nikolai Baturin (5 August 1936 – 16 May 2019) was an Estonian award-winning novelist and playwright.

Biography and career

Baturin was born in Arumetsa village, Suislepa Parish (now Maltsa village, Tarvastu Parish), Viljandi County. His father was a fisherman. After attending high school, military service took him for five years to the Caspian oil-fields and the Atlantic Ocean; for fifteen years he was a hunter in the Siberian taiga. For six years he participated in various geological expeditions.

Baturin debuted with a collection of poetry, Maa-alused järved (Underground Lakes, 1968), in the last wave of the "cassette" generation in the 1960s. Besides fiction he has written drama, poetry, screenplays and essays. He has illustrated his own books and produced his own plays. His works have been translated into Russian, Ukrainian, and Lithuanian. He became a member of the Estonian Writers' Union in 1973.

Baturin lived at his home farm by Lake Võrtsjärv.

Bibliography

Collections of poetry

 Blue Reign, 1990 (4000).
 The Silence of the Pole. The Pole of Silence, 1980 (3000).
 The Gallery, 1977 (4000)
 The Flight of the Stork, 1975 (5000).
 From the Squares and from the Fields, 1972 (4000).
 The Lyrefish, 1972 (4000).
 Underground Lakes, 1968 (12,000).

Novels, short stories and prose poems

 The Centaur, 2003
 Apocalypse Anno Domini, 1997 (1000)
 Caught in a Vicious Circle, 1996 (2000).
 Timid Nikas, the Comber of Lions' Manes, 1993 (10,000).
 A Murder at the Lighthouse, 1993 (16,000)
 The Heart of the Bear, 1989 (16,000).
 Early Ice, 1985 (25,000).
 Forests Spreading Far and Wide:a prose poem, 1981 (5000)
 Somersaults (prose poem, short story, drama), 1980 (8000)
 Echo Finds, 1977 (28,000).
 King of the King's Cabin, 1976 (28,000).
 The Oasis, 1973 (23,000).
 At an Early Late Hour: a prose poem, 1973 (20,000).

Screenplays

 Timid Nikas, the Comber of Lions' Manes, 1999.
 A Murder at the Lighthouse, 1994.
 The Heart of the Bear (in seven instalments), 1993.
 Summer Snowstorms, 1992.

Dramas

 A Ghost in the Cupboard, 1993 (5000).
 The Diamond Path, 1986 (5000)
 A Dwarf on the Cothurns

References
 Estonian Literature Information Center

External links
 Nikolai Baturin at Estonian Writers' Online Dictionary

1936 births
2019 deaths
People from Viljandi Parish
Estonian male novelists
Estonian people of Russian descent
Estonian dramatists and playwrights
Estonian male poets
20th-century Estonian novelists
20th-century Estonian poets
21st-century Estonian novelists
21st-century Estonian poets
Recipients of the Order of the White Star, 5th Class